Palisade State Park is a state park of Utah, USA, located just outside the small town of Sterling.  The park offers tent, RV, and cabin camping, along with fishing, swimming, non-motorized (and electric motor) boating, golfing, and hiking. Off highway vehicle trails are also accessible from the park.

History
In the 1860s, Daniel B. Funk, an early settler of the surrounding Sanpete Valley, had the idea of a summer and weekend resort area. At that time, the valley was owned by a small group of Sanpitch Indians led by Chief Arapeen. Daniel B. Funk bargained with the chief and obtained a land patent from the government. He and his family then set about the arduous task of building a dam and diverting part of Sixmile Creek to fill the lake. The lake quickly became a well-known pleasure resort, now called Palisade.

See also

 List of Utah State Parks

References

External links

 

Protected areas established in 1962
Protected areas of Sanpete County, Utah
State parks of Utah